Louis-August Papavoine was a French violinist and composer.  His first name is uncertain, as is his birth and death information.  He is believed to have been born in Normandy about 1720, and probably died in Marseilles about 1793.  In 1752, he published Six simphonies op.1, dedicated to "le Marquis de la Bourdonnaye, Conseiller d’État, Intendant de Rouen."  From 1756–1758, he wrote orchestral and chamber works.

In 1761, his opera Les deux amies, ou le vieux garçon, also known as Le Vieux Coquet, ou les deux amies, the earliest known operatic adaptation of William Shakespeare's The Merry Wives of Windsor, premiered in Paris.  According to Winton Dean, it was "killed by its libretto after one performance."

Personal life
About 1754, Papavoine married a musician and composer surnamed Pellecier, who became known as Mme Papavoine.  They may have been the parents of Jean-Noël Papavoine, a maître des pantomimes et répétiteur active in Lille and The Hague.

References

Barry S. Brook, Richard Viano and Julie Anne Sadie. "Papavoine" Oxford Music Online, January 2001. https://oxfordindex.oup.com/view/10.1093/gmo/9781561592630.article.20850

1720 births
1793 deaths
18th-century French male violinists
18th-century French composers